Åsa Elisabeth Mogensen (born 21 June 1972 as Åsa Eriksson) is a Swedish former handball player. She is the player with most caps (251) for the Sweden women's handball team and she scored 1087 goals for the Swedish national team.

She was Swedish junior curler too, played on 1991 and 1992 World Junior Championships.

Achievements
EHF City Cup: 1997/98
Swedish League: 1992, 1994, 1995 and 1996
Danish League: 1998
Danish Cup: 1999, 2000 and 2005

References

External links
 

1972 births
Living people
Swedish female handball players
Swedish female curlers
Expatriate handball players
Swedish expatriate sportspeople in Norway
Swedish expatriate sportspeople in Denmark
Swedish expatriate sportspeople in Spain